Neighborhood Texture Jam is a Memphis, Tennessee rock band who fuse elements of punk, industrial and funk into a heavy, rhythmic rock sound.  Notable for a member responsible for providing the "texture" - an ever-changing assembly of 55-gallon oil drums, hub caps, corrugated sheet metal, household appliances and other found objects that serve as auxiliary percussion.

The band was originally formed in 1984 at Rhodes College by Joe Lapsley and Ed Scott.  The first incarnation of the band lasted three gigs before breaking up.  Reforming in 1988, the band signed with Feralette Records and achieved national recognition with their debut album, Funeral Mountain, released in 1990.

Following a line-up change in which Tom Murphy was replaced by John Whittemore, the band switched labels to Ardent Records and released 1993's Don't Bury Me In Haiti.

1994 saw another change in labels when Ardent Records closed its alternative mainstream division to concentrate on Christian music.  The band landed on Snerd Records and released the 7" single, Rush Limbaugh-Evil Blimp/Awesome in 1994 and the full-length album, Total Social Negation in 1996.

After a long recording hiatus, the band premiered its long-rumored rock opera, Frank Rizzo at Colonus in 2003, following up with a repeat performance in 2006.  2006 also saw the release of a pair of B-Side albums, They Buried Me In Memphis, Vols. 1 and 2 on Snerd Records.

Current Band Members
Joe Lapsley - lead vocals
Tee Cloar - guitar
Steven Conn - bass guitar
Paul Buchignani - drums
Greg Easterly - texture
John Whittemore - guitar

Former Members
Ed Scott - guitar
Sloan Wilson - texture
Carter Green - texture
Tony Pantuso - drums
Tom Murphy - guitar
Mark Harrison - guitar
Fletcher Ward - guitar

Former Auxiliary Members
Derek Van Lynn - saxophone
Montie Davis - guitar
Sam Nowlin - texture

Album Discography
Funeral Mountain (1990)
Don't Bury Me In Haiti (1993)
Total Social Negation (1996)
They Buried Me In Memphis, Vol. 1 (2006)
They Buried Me In Memphis, Vol. 2 (2006)

Single Discography
McThorazine/Waiting In Sverdlovsk (1992)
Rush Limbaugh-Evil Blimp/Awesome (1994)

External links
Neighborhood Texture Jam Official Website
MySpace

Rock music groups from Tennessee
Musical groups from Memphis, Tennessee